The coat of arms of Algiers, the capital of Algeria, was created after the country's independence, it shows a fortress, which symbolizes the Casbah, and a boat which symbolize the Algerian fleet, vital to the country's economy in older times, as well as two lions, which can be seen in Bab Azzoun, one of the gates of the city. The crescent symbolizes Islam, the state religion, the feather to symbolize scientific and cultural development. The sheaf of corn (the main crop of the country)  symbolizes agriculture, while the wheel symbolizes industry (Algiers is the largest industrial center of the country).

On top of the shield is a mural crown.

Former arms

During the time as a French colony, the arms of Algiers had a bend sinister or in the arms, on which was a lion proper. The lion was also resting its paw on a boulet, likewise having the tincture proper. This and the inescutcheon with the cross was removed when creating the present arms.

Sources
 Heraldry of the World: Alger/Algiers

Algiers
Algiers
Algiers
Algiers
Algiers
Algiers
Algiers